Jomhod "King of the Ring" Kiatadisak (born 5 July 1970) is a professional Muay Thai fighter from Phang Nga province in the South of Thailand. He started learning muay Thai at the age of 7 and won his first fight when he was 11 years old. In 1986, Jomhod won the Southern Thailand Championship in 59.6 kg weight category and the same year, at the age of 16, he moved to Bangkok and began his proper fighting career.

Jomhod fought in Lumpinee stadium for the first time in 1989. At the age of 18 he won the Lumpinee Lightweight Title, he never lost the belt but vacated it to move up in weight. In 1994 he won the Rachadamernn Championship in the same weight class, followed by the super lightweight title the next year and at one stage simultaneously held titles in both Lumpinee Stadium and Rajadamnern Stadium.

In 1995 Jomhod moved to Finland after a request to come fight and coach there. He lived in Finland for 11 years winning numerous titles in muay Thai and kickboxing. In 2006 he moved back to Thailand to be head coach at the J. Prapa Gym in Kata Beach, Phuket but recently opened his own gym, Jomhod Muay Thai, near Phuket airport and Nai Yang beach.

In 1998 he won the Muay Thai Champion's League Final in Amsterdam beating Sakmongkol Sithchuchok by TKO (round three) in the final. He holds a notable win over Ramon Dekkers from the King's Cup in 1996 and a notable K-1 loss to Buakaw Por. Pramuk from 2006. Other Western opponents he has beaten include Ivan Hippolyte, Ole Laursen and Eval Denton.

Jomhod has continued to fight occasionally in Phuket even though he is now in his 40s and in December 2012 he returned to Bangkok, beating former Olympic gold medal winner Somluck Kamsing by decision at Lumpinee Stadium.

Titles
World Muaythai Council (WMC)
2011 W.M.C. Muay Thai World Champion -76.2 kg
2004 W.M.C. Muay Thai World Champion -72.6 kg
2000 W.M.C. Muay Thai World Champion -69.8 kg
1991 W.M.T.C. Muay Thai World Champion -66.7 kg
International Sport Karate Association (ISKA)
2003 I.S.K.A. Muay Thai World Champion -69.8 kg
2002 I.S.K.A. Muay Thai World Champion -69.8 kg
1998 I.S.K.A. Muay Thai World Champion -66.7 kg
World Professional Kickboxing League (WPKL) 
2002 W.P.K.L. Muay Thai World Champion -69.8 kg
2000 W.P.K.L Muay Thai World Champion -69.8 kg
World Professional Kickboxing Association (WPKA)
2001 W.P.K.A. Muay Thai World Champion -69.8 kg
World Kickboxing Network (WKN) 
2000 W.K.N. Muay Thai World Champion -72.6 kg
Muay Thai Champions League 
2000 Muay Thai Champions League Tournament Champion -70 kg
World Kickboxing Association (WKA) 
1998 W.K.A. Muay Thai World Champion -66.7 kg
International Kickboxing Federation (IKBF)
1998 I.K.B.F. Kickboxing World Champion -66.7 kg
World Muay Thai Association (WMTA)
1996 W.M.T.A. Muay Thai World Champion -69.8 kg
Rajadamnern Stadium 
1994 Rajadamnern Stadium Champion -66.7 kg
1992 Rajadamnern Stadium -63.5 kg
Lumpinee Stadium
1989 Lumpinee Stadium Champion  -63.5 kg
Regional
1986 South Thailand Champion -59.6 kg

Muaythai record

|-  style="background:#fbb;"
| 2013-02-07 || Loss ||align=left| Somrak Thor.Thepsuthin || Rajadamnern Stadium || Bangkok, Thailand || Decision || 5 || 3:00
|-
|-  style="background:#cfc;"
| 2012-12-07 || Win ||align=left| Somrak Thor.Thepsuthin || Lumpinee Champion Krikkrai Fight, Lumpinee Stadium || Bangkok, Thailand || Decision || 5 || 3:00
|-
|-  style="background:#cfc;" 
| 2011-12-28 || Win ||align=left| Adaylton Freitas || || Phuket, Thailand || ||  || 
|-
! style=background:white colspan=9 |
|- 
|-  style="background:#cfc;"
| 2011-11-02 || Win ||align=left| Umar Semata || Bangla Stadium || Phuket, Thailand || Decision || 5 || 3:00
|- 
|-  style="background:#cfc;"
| 2010-12-29 || Win ||align=left| Cyrus Washington || Bangla Stadium || Phuket, Thailand || Decision || 5 || 3:00
|-
|-  style="background:#cfc;"
| 2010-10-16 || Win ||align=left| Hicham Chaibi || Fight Festival 28 || Helsinki, Finland || Decision || 5 || 3:00
|- 
|-  style="background:#fbb;" 
| 2007-00-00 || Loss ||align=left| Soren Monkongtong || Lumpinee Stadium || Bangkok, Thailand || Decision || 5 || 3:00 
|-
|-  style="background:#fbb;" 
| 2006-12-05 || Loss ||align=left| Dzhabar Askerov || King's Cup 2006, Semi Finals || Bangkok, Thailand || Decision || 3 || 3:00 
|-
|-  style="background:#fbb;" 
| 2006-08-19 || Loss ||align=left| Steve Wakeling || Muaythai Legends - England vs Thailand || London, UK || Decision || 5 || 3:00 
|-  style="background:#fbb;"
| 2006-02-18 || Loss ||align=left| Buakaw Por. Pramuk || WMC Explosion III || Stockholm, Sweden || KO(Right Hook to the body) || 2 || 
|-
! style=background:white colspan=9 |
|- 
|-  style="background:#fbb;"
| 2005-12-18 || Loss ||align=left| Şahin Yakut || It's Showtime 75MAX Trophy Prague, Pool B Final || Prague, Czech Republic || Ext.R Decision || 4 || 3:00
|-
! style=background:white colspan=9 |
|-
|-  style="background:#cfc;"
| 2005-12-18 || Win ||align=left| Jindrich Velecky  || It's Showtime 75MAX Trophy Prague, Pool B Semi Finals || Prague, Czech Republic ||  ||  ||  
|-
|-  style="background:#cfc;" 
| 2005-02-19 || Win || align=left| Arslan Magomedov ||  ||  || TKO (Cut) || 2 ||  
|-
! style=background:white colspan=9 |
|- 
|-
|-  style="background:#cfc;" 
| 2005-05-21 || Win || align=left| Alex Dally || Rumble of the Kings 2005 K-1 World GP North European || Stockholm, Sweden || Decision || 5 || 3:00 
|-
! style=background:white colspan=9 |
|- 
|-  style="background:#cfc;" 
| 2004-10-23 || Win || align=left| Darius Skliaudys || Lumpinee Gaala II (75 kg fight) || Helsinki, Finland || TKO || 4 ||  
|-  style="background:#cfc;" 
| 2004-09-05 || Win || align=left| Wanlop Sitpholek || || Stockholm, Sweden || Decision || 5 || 3:00  
|-
! style=background:white colspan=9 |
|- 
|-  style="background:#cfc;" 
| 2003-04-05 || Win || align=left| William Diender || Kings Of The Ring - Kickboxing Superstar XI || Milan, Italy || Decision || 5 || 3:00 
|-
! style=background:white colspan=9 |
|- 
|-  style="background:#cfc;"
| 2003-03-15 || Win ||align=left| Ole Laursen || K-1 World GP 2003 Scandinavia || Stockholm, Sweden || Decision || 3 || 3:00
|-
|-  style="background:#cfc;" 
| 2002-11-03 || Win ||align=left| Chris van Venrooij || Muay Thai Hoofddorp || Hoofddorp, Netherlands || Decision (Unanimous) || 5 || 3:00
|-
! style=background:white colspan=9 | 
|-
|-  style="background:#cfc;" 
| 2002-00-00 || Win ||align=left| Ron Post || OKTAGON K-1 || Milan, Italy || ||  ||
|-
! style=background:white colspan=9 | 
|-
|-  style="background:#cfc;" 
| 2001-03-31 || Win ||align=left| Jerry Morris || || TKO || 4|| ||
|-
! style=background:white colspan=9 | 
|-
|-  style="background:#cfc;" 
| 2001-03-03 || Win ||align=left| Stjepan Veselic || The Night of Explosion || Rotterdam, Netherlands || Decision || 5 || 3:00  
|- 
|-
|-  style="background:#cfc;" 
| 2000-10-23 || Win ||align=left| Laurent Periquet || Fight Festival 2|| Helsinki, Finland || TKO || 3 ||
|-
! style=background:white colspan=9 | 
|-
|-  style="background:#cfc;" 
| 2000-05-15 || Win ||align=left| Hassan Kassrioui || ||  || ||  ||
|-
! style=background:white colspan=9 | 
|-
|-  style="background:#cfc;" 
| 2000-00-00 || Win ||align=left| Luke Kempton || ||  || ||  || 
|-
! style=background:white colspan=9 | 
|-
|-  style="background:#cfc;" 
| 1999-00-00 || Win ||align=left| Tim Izli || || UK || TKO || 4 ||
|-
|-  style="background:#cfc;" 
| 1999-02-20 || Win ||align=left| Mohammed Ouali || ||  || KO || 2 || 
|-  style="background:#cfc;"
| 1998-11-14 || Win ||align=left| Sakmongkol Sithchuchok || Muay Thai Champions League III, Final || Amsterdam, Netherlands || TKO || 3 || 
|-
! style=background:white colspan=9 | 
|-
|-  style="background:#cfc;"  
| 1998-11-14 || Win ||align=left| Rayen Simson || Muay Thai Champions League III, Semi Finals || Amsterdam, Netherlands || Decision || 3 || 3:00 
|-
|-  style="background:#cfc;" 
| 1998-09-07 || Win ||align=left| Guillaume Caldeira || ||  || ||  || 
|-
! style=background:white colspan=9 | 
|- 
|-  style="background:#fbb;"
| 1998-05-30 || Loss ||align=left| Francois Pennacchio || ||  || Decision || 12 || 3:00
|-
! style=background:white colspan=9 | 
|- 
|-  style="background:#cfc;" 
| 1998-05-23 || Win ||align=left| Gerald Zwane || ||  || Decision || 5 || 3:00 
|-
|-  style="background:#cfc;"  
| 1998-05-02 || Win ||align=left| Abdullah Aouj || Muay Thai Champions League I, Quarter Finals || Roosendaal, Netherlands ||  ||  ||  
|-
! style=background:white colspan=9 |
|-  style="background:#cfc;"  
| 1998-05-02 || Win ||align=left| Najim Ettouhlali || Muay Thai Champions League I, 1st Round || Roosendaal, Netherlands || ||  || 
|-
|-  style="background:#cfc;" 
| 1998-04-25 || Win ||align=left| Eval Denton || ||  || ||  || 
|-
! style=background:white colspan=9 | 
|- 
|-  style="background:#cfc;"
| 1998-04-00 || Win ||align=left| Takashi Ito ||  || France || KO(Body shot with knee) || 2 || 
|-
|-  style="background:#cfc;" 
| 1998-01-22 || Win ||align=left| Guiseppe Timperanza || ||  || ||  || 
|-
! style=background:white colspan=9 | 
|- 
|-  style="background:#fbb;"
| 1997-11-22 || Loss ||align=left| Saimai Chor Suananun || Tournoi des 50000 (67 kg), Semi Finals || Paris, France || ||  || 
|-
|-  style="background:#cfc;" 
| 1997-11-22 || Win ||align=left| Ashley Guishard || Tournoi des 50000 (67 kg), Quarter Finals || Paris, France || ||  || 
|-
|-  style="background:#cfc;" 
| 1996-11-25 || Win ||align=left| Sergei Havitzkin || || Helsinki, Finland || ||  || 
|-

|-  style="background:#cfc;" 
| 1994-11-06 || Win ||align=left| Morad Djebli || || Chiang Rai, Thailand || ||  || 
|-

|-  style="background:#cfc;" 
| 1994-09-20 || Win ||align=left| Ramon Dekkers ||  Muay Thai World Championships in honor of the King || Bangkok, Thailand || Decision (Unanimous) || 5 || 3:00 
|-
! style=background:white colspan=9 |

|-  style="background:#cfc;" 
| 1994- || Win ||align=left| Chandet Sor Prantalay ||   || Bangkok, Thailand ||  Decision || 5 || 3:00

|-  style="background:#cfc;" 
| 1994-03-26 || Win ||align=left| Paul Briggs || || Brisbane, Australia || KO (Left low kick) ||  2|| 
|-
! style=background:white colspan=9 |

|-  style="background:#cfc;" 
| 1994-01-27 || Win ||align=left| Vichan Chor.Rojanachai|| Rajadamnern Stadium || Bangkok, Thailand || Decision|| 5 ||3:00 
|-
! style=background:white colspan=9 |

|-  style="background:#cfc;" 
| 1992–1993 || Win ||align=left| Orlando Wiet || || Germany || ||  || 
|-

|-  style="background:#cfc;" 
| 1992-12-12 || Win ||align=left| Sittisak Toranusron ||  || Malaysia ||Decision || 5 ||3:00 
|-
! style=background:white colspan=9 |

|-  style="background:#cfc;" 
| 1992-08-15 || Win ||align=left| Nonglek Lukklongchan || Channel 7 stadium || Bangkok, Thailand ||Decision || 5 ||3:00

|-  style="background:#cfc;" 
| 1992-05-31 || Win ||align=left| Sittisak Toranusron || Channel 7 stadium || Bangkok, Thailand ||Decision || 5 ||3:00 
|-
! style=background:white colspan=9 | 
|-  style="background:#cfc;" 
| 1992-03-01 || Win ||align=left| Ivan Hippolyte || Holland vs Thailand 7 ||  Netherlands|| Decision|| 5 ||3:00 
|-
|-  style="background:#cfc;" 
| 1991-1992 || Win ||align=left| Tony Anderson || || Oklahoma, United States || KO (high kick)|| 1||

|-  style="background:#cfc;" 
| 1991-00-00 || Win ||align=left| Kash Gill || || UK || ||  || 
|-
|-  style="background:#cfc;" 
| 1991-00-00 || Win ||align=left| || ||  || ||  || 
|-
! style=background:white colspan=9 | 
|-
|-  style="background:#cfc;" 
| 1991-03-17 || Win ||align=left| Mongkhondej Kiatprasarnchai || Channel 7 Stadium || Bangkok, Thailand || Decision ||5  ||3:00
|-  style="background:#cfc;" 
| 1990-10-14 || Win ||align=left| Bayran Colak || ||  || ||  ||
|-  style="background:#cfc;" 
| 1990-07-29 || Win ||align=left| Pothai Chorvikun || Channel 7 Stadium || Bangkok, Thailand || TKO (Referee Stoppage)||5  || 
|-
|-  style="background:#fbb;"
| 1990-05-27 || Loss ||align=left| Ivan Hippolyte || (155 lbs fight) || Phoenix, USA ||TKO || 3 ||
|-  style="background:#cfc;" 
| 1990-04-21 || Win ||align=left| Sittisak Saksanguan || Lumpinee stadium || Bangkok, Thailand ||  ||  || 
|-
! style=background:white colspan=9 | 
|-
|-  style="background:#cfc;" 
| 1989-11 || Win ||align=left| Michel Ubbergen || || United States || KO||  ||
|-  style="background:#cfc;" 
| 1989-08-12 || Win ||align=left| Pothai Chorvikun || Lumpinee stadium || Bangkok, Thailand || Decision ||5  ||3:00 
|-
! style=background:white colspan=9 | 
|-
|-  style="background:#fbb;"
| 1989-01-09|| Loss||align=left| Nokweed Davy || || Phang Nga province, Thailand || KO || 1 ||
|-  style="background:#cfc;" 
| 1988-11-05 || Win ||align=left| Saengthong Sitlakmuang || Lumpinee Stadium || Bangkok, Thailand || Decision || 5 || 3:00
|-  style="background:#cfc;" 
| 1988-08-14 || Win ||align=left| Rungsak Sitseinkuy || Channel 7 Stadium || Bangkok, Thailand || Decision || 5 || 3:00
|-  style="background:#cfc;" 
| 1988-06-26 || Win ||align=left| Phetmai Jockygym || Channel 7 Stadium || Bangkok, Thailand || Decision || 5 || 3:00
|-  style="background:#fbb;" 
| 1988- || Loss ||align=left| Phromlikit Boonrot ||  || Phuket, Thailand || Decision || 5 || 3:00

|-  style="background:#fbb;" 
| 1984- || Loss ||align=left| Nokweed Devy ||  || Thailand || KO || 3 ||  
|-
! style=background:white colspan=9 | 
|-
| colspan=9 | Legend:

See also 
List of male kickboxers

References

 Ryhänen, Tapio. A telephone call with Jomhod Kiatadisak in June 2012.
 Jomhod Kiatadisak website. Jomhod Kiatadisak.
 Ryhänen, Tapio. An telephone interview with Jomhod Kiatadisak in January 2012.
Immonen, Riku. Jomhod vs. Buakaw: One night in Bangkok. www.kickbox.nl.  URL last accessed June 13, 2007.
 Jigotai. Nuorena vitsa väännettävä. www.jigotai.fi. URL last accessed June 13, 2007. (In Finnish)
 King of the Ring. Jomhod Kiatadisak. www.kingofthering.fi. URL last accessed June 12, 2007. (In Finnish)

1970 births
Living people
Featherweight kickboxers
Lightweight kickboxers
Welterweight kickboxers
Middleweight kickboxers
Jomhod Kiatadisak
Jomhod Kiatadisak
Thai expatriate sportspeople in Finland